Peçanha is a municipality in the state of Minas Gerais in the Southeast region of Brazil.

See also 
List of municipalities in Minas Gerais

References 

Municipalities in Minas Gerais